Turkana County is a county in the former Rift Valley Province of Kenya. It is Kenya's largest county by land area (followed by Marsabit County), and also its northwesternmost. It is bordered by the countries of Uganda to the west; South Sudan and Ethiopia, including the disputed Ilemi Triangle, to the north and northeast; and Lake Turkana to the east. To the south and east, neighbouring counties in Kenya are West Pokot, Baringo and Samburu Counties, while Marsabit County is on the opposite (i.e. eastern) shore of Lake Turkana. Turkana's capital and largest town is Lodwar. The county had a population of 926,976 at the 2019 census.

History
Four sites of Stone Age cultures are situated upon tributaries along the west side of Lake Turkana in West Turkana; at Lokalalei, Kokiselei and Nadungu, and became of interest to archaeology beginning sometime during 1988.

The earliest late Stone age industries in prehistory were found in Turkana, at the site of Lomekwi, and date to 3,300,000 years. At the archaeological site of Nataruk, in Southwest Turkana, scientists have discovered the oldest evidence of inter-group conflict in the past, establishing that warfare occurred between groups of hunter-gatherers.

From 1900 until 1926, the British colonial administration in Kenya gradually established control over the Turkana people.

By 1926, the Turkana people were fully under the control of the British colonial administration, who subsequently forcibly restricted their movements to the Turkana region.

During 1958, the district experienced an influx of a number of people classified as belonging to the Turkana people. These had been expelled from the Kenyan town of Isiolo, and forcibly relocated to the Turkana district by the colonial administration.

The district maintained an all but complete isolation until 1976 when road-blocks leading to the district were lifted by the Kenyan government.

In 2000, the people in the north of the county were reported as being harassed by marauding Ethiopians, and were consequently forced to relocate in southern areas.

Population

Language
Turkana is known in the local language as ng'turkana. Some place names in the country are attributed to the language of the Pokot and Samburu peoples, representing a tradition in the area of inhabitation by these peoples prior to displacement by the Turkana.

Geography
The county is within the boundaries of the former Rift Valley province. According to data provided during 1991 the majority of the population at that time lived by way of farming. With an area of nearly 77,000 km2, Turkana is the largest county, including the area covered by Lake Tukana, in Kenya.

Turkana County is emerging to be a major source of electric power in Kenya. Kengen's Turkwel Hydro Power Plant, situated on the southwest of Turkana County, produces hydroelectric power which is connected to the national power grid at Lessos. The county is current subject of crude oil exploration in Block 10BB and Block 13T and has potential for geothermal, solar and wind energy.

Kekarongole and Katilu had irrigation networks made commencing sometime during or after 1975.

Rainfall measurements per annum (1982 data) is recorded as less than ten inches; with a range of between 115mm and 650mm.

There were thirteen drought periods in a period of 50 years beginning 1938.

Economics
Turkana is the poorest region in Kenya. The county is, however, experiencing upward reviews due to ongoing mineral explorations and inventions, especially of oil and water resources. Turkana County residents are also enjoying the fruits of devolution. Devolution of power in Kenya is viewed as a blessing for the forgotten people of Turkana. It has been received in the sub- counties with much appreciation due to its direct benefits to the citizens. The current administration shares out these benefits equally to all sub counties in addition to enhancing citizen participation in development activities. 

On 26 March 2012, Kenyan President Mwai Kibaki announced that oil had been discovered in Turkana County after exploratory drilling by Anglo-Irish firm Tullow Oil, and he further stated that: 

Gold panning was reported (2005) as occurring at Lochoremoit, Namoruputh, Lokiriama and Ng, akoriyiek.

According to Barrett (2001) cited in Watson the wealth of a person is kept in the form of cattle.

Figures stated as of 1998 stated an average estimated herd size of 15–20.

In 2013 it was announced by UNESCO that large reserves of groundwater had been discovered in Turkana County. The water was discovered using satellite exploration technology then confirmed by drilling. The extraction of the water began in 2014 and it is being piped to provide water to Lodwar town for irrigation and water for the people.

Government [Turkana County Government Website: http://www.turkana.go.ke/]

Promulgation of the Constitution of Kenya 2010 marked a momentous point in the country's history. The Constitution provided for, among others, enhanced checks and balances within the government, an enhanced role of Parliament and citizens, an independent judiciary, and a most progressive Bill of Rights. . Turkana County is one of the 47 counties of Kenya. The county is led by H.E. Governor Jeremiah Lomorukai,  and Turkana County has 10 Ministries.

Travel
The county is connected to Nairobi through regular commercial flights to Lodwar airport. The World Food Programme runs a special UN Humanitarian Air Service for UN and INGO staff.

County subdivisions

The county has six constituencies:
Loima Constituency
Turkana Central Constituency
Turkana East Constituency
Turkana North Constituency
Turkana South Constituency
Turkana West Constituency

The counties have six sub counties

Villages and settlements 
 Anglogitat
 Angorangora

See also
Eliye Springs, a village located in Kalokol division
Kenyans for Kenya
Ilemi Triangle

References

External links
http://www.aridland.go.ke/bulletins/June%202006-Turkana.pdf
http://www.aridland.go.ke/districts.asp?DistrictID=1
Map of the district

 
Counties of Kenya
Turkana people